John V. McClusky is an American astronomer. He is a prolific discoverer of asteroids.

List of discovered minor planets

See also 
 List of minor planet discoverers

References 
 

American astronomers
Discoverers of asteroids

Living people
Year of birth missing (living people)